Gaily, Gaily (released in the United Kingdom as Chicago, Chicago) is a 1969 American comedy film directed by Norman Jewison. It is a fictionalized adaptation of a 1963 memoir of the same name by Ben Hecht and stars Beau Bridges, Brian Keith, George Kennedy, Hume Cronyn and Melina Mercouri.

The film featured two songs sung by Mercouri with lyrics by Alan and Marilyn Bergman set to Henry Mancini's music.

Plot
Set in 1910, the film's main character is Ben Harvey (patterned after Ben Hecht): serious about seeing the world, he leaves his home for Chicago, where he meets a woman named Lil, who in reality is the madam of the bordello Ben mistakes for a boarding house. He also is friendly with Adeline, one of the prostitutes. While he tries to find work, Ben encounters other people, including a hard drinking reporter named Sullivan, plus two other men, Grogan and Johanson, who are involved in shady doings in city government. Suspecting corruption, both Harvey and Sullivan decide to investigate.

Cast
 Beau Bridges as Ben Harvey
 Melina Mercouri as Lilan
 Brian Keith as Sullivan
 George Kennedy as Johanson
 Hume Cronyn as Grogan
 Margot Kidder as Adeline
 Roy Poole as Dunne
 Wilfrid Hyde-White as The Governor
 Melodie Johnson as Lilah
 John Randolph as Father
 Charles Tyner as Dr. Lazarus
 Joan Huntington as Kitty
 Merie Earle as Granny
 Claudia Bryar as Mother
 Eric Shea as Younger Brother

Production
Director Norman Jewison wanted to film on location in Chicago, but found the city too modern for the film's setting: "Chicago has some nice, old streets, but behind every one of them there’s a 70 story skyscraper," he said. Exteriors instead were shot in Milwaukee, where modern skyscrapers were less prevalent, during June and July 1968. The North American title comes from a poem by the Canadian poet, Bliss Carman: "Oh but life went gayly, gayly,/In the house of Idiedaily!/There were always throats to sing/Down the riverbanks with spring."

Reception

The film holds a score of 60% on Rotten Tomatoes based on 5 reviews.

Vincent Canby of The New York Times called it "a movie of great and exuberant charm, one that pays homage to the classic conventions of American farce by defining them with nostalgia and cinematic wit." Variety declared it "a lushly staged, handsomely produced, largely unfunny comedy. There are a few bright spots, and a certain segment of the audience may find the film amusing, naughty and risque." Pauline Kael of The New Yorker wrote, "A good subject, a charming plot, and not too bad a script (by Abram S. Ginnes) have been lost along the way in this overproduced period re-creation that is only moderately entertaining. The director, Norman Jewison, tries hard, but he just doesn't have the feeling for Hecht's Chicago; he uses huge mobs and big locations, but the whole movie seems to be on a musical-comedy stage." Gene Siskel of the Chicago Tribune gave the film three stars out of four and wrote that it "is paled by Hecht's writings, but it stands well ahead of many films, as fine entertainment that will have you laughing." Kevin Thomas of the Los Angeles Times called it "a delightful comedy" with "most persuasive" performances. Gary Arnold of The Washington Post wrote, "By all rights, the material should be great on film, but Jewison, stymied by either a lack of wit or a desire to be too ingratiating, gets the least interesting effect possible. This 'Gaily, Gaily' is a bumptious family comedy rather than the uninhibited but poignant elegy to youth and recreation of a vanished era that Hecht had in mind." David Pirie of The Monthly Film Bulletin wrote, "The script here is a fairly predictable period romp, based loosely on Ben Hecht's novel and only very sporadically funny. Even more disappointing, despite a reasonably distinguished cast and Jewison's proven ability with actors, is that there is barely only one really enjoyable performance in the whole film: only Brian Keith, as a shamelessly unscrupulous and sentimental Irish newsman, is fully successful, and he provides nearly all the film's best comedy."

Awards
The film was nominated for three Academy Awards:
 Best Art Direction (Art Direction: Robert F. Boyle and George B. Chan; Set Decoration: Edward G. Boyle and Carl Biddiscombe)
 Best Costume Design (Ray Aghayan)
 Best Sound (Robert Martin and Clem Portman)

References

External links
 
 
 

1969 films
1969 comedy films
1960s coming-of-age comedy films
American coming-of-age comedy films
Films about journalists
Films based on American novels
Films directed by Norman Jewison
Films scored by Henry Mancini
Films set in 1910
Films set in Chicago
United Artists films
1960s English-language films
1960s American films